Seward Township is one of seventeen townships in Kosciusko County, Indiana, United States. As of the 2010 census, its population was 2,567 and it contained 1,385 housing units.

Seward Township was organized in 1859.

Geography

Cities and towns
 Burket

References

External links
 Indiana Township Association
 United Township Association of Indiana

Townships in Kosciusko County, Indiana
Townships in Indiana